The Mulago Hospital massacre occurred at the Mulago Government African Hospital in Kampala, Uganda on July 28, 1950.
After visiting his dying son at the hospital, 55-year-old Lazaro Obwara ran down the ward and stabbed a woman and eleven children with a knife, all of whom died. Obwara was arrested and charged with ten counts of murder.

References

Mass murder in 1950
Massacres in Uganda
1950 in Uganda
History of Kampala
Massacres in 1950
Attacks on hospitals
July 1950 events in Africa